Dávid Zimonyi (born 24 December 1997) is a Hungarian professional footballer who plays as a forward for Vasas.

Club career
On 14 February 2022, Zimonyi joined Vasas on loan until the end of the season, with an obligation for Vasas to buy his rights in case of promotion. Vasas achieved the promotion, and the club bought out his rights.

References

External links
HLSZ

1997 births
Sportspeople from Győr-Moson-Sopron County
21st-century Hungarian people
Living people
Hungarian footballers
Association football forwards
Lipót SE players
Zalaegerszegi TE players
Vasas SC players
Nemzeti Bajnokság I players
Nemzeti Bajnokság II players
Nemzeti Bajnokság III players